Acantholycosa katunensis is a species of wolf spider only known from the Katun Mountain Range in the Russian part of the Altai Mountains.

This spider is 8.5 mm in length. It can only be separated from its closest congeners by details of the genitalia.

References

Lycosidae
Spiders described in 2003
Spiders of Russia